Jawa may refer to:

Places

Southeast Asia
Java, the most populous and fifth-largest island in Indonesia and the site of its capital, Jakarta
East Java, also called Jawa Timur, a province on the Indonesian island of Java
Central Java, also called Jawa Tengah, a province on the Indonesian island of Java
West Java, also called Jawa Barat, a province on the Indonesian island of Java
Chek Jawa, a cape and the name of its 100-hectare wetlands located on the south-eastern tip of Pulau Ubin off coast of Singapore
Karimunjava, an archipelago of 69 islands in the Java Sea, Indonesia, approximately 80 kilometres northwest of Jepara
Padang Jawa, a small town in Selangor, Malaysia
Parit Jawa, a main town in Muar district, Johor, Malaysia

Middle East
Jawa, Jordan, archaeological site in Jordan
Tall Jawa, Iron Age village in central Jordan
Zaduqabad, Iran, a village in Markazi Province, Iran, also known as Jāwa

Entertainment
Jawa (Star Wars), a fictional alien species from Star Wars
Langgam jawa, a regional form of Indonesian kroncong music most often associated with the city of Surakarta
Jawa: Mammoth and the Stone's Secret, a 2008 game for the Nintendo Wii home video game console

Other uses
Jawa Moto, also known as JAWA Motokov, a manufacturer of motorcycles based in the Czech Republic
Jawa Pos, an Indonesian daily newspaper published in Surabaya, East Java
The Jawa Report, a blog and forum for civilians concerned about terrorism by Islamists
Joint Action Water Agency, a form of organization for public water supply utilities
 The Javanese language, sometimes known as Jawa

See also 
Java (disambiguation)
Jawan (disambiguation)